The 1862 Arkansas gubernatorial election was the ninth gubernatorial election, held on Monday, October 6, 1862. In the midst of the American Civil War, Colonel Harris Flanagin easily defeated incumbent Governor Henry M. Rector and Independent candidate John S. H. Rainey with 69.06% of the vote. Flanagin took office as the seventh governor on November 15, 1862.

It was the only gubernatorial election conducted following the adoption of Arkansas's second constitution. The Democratic Party did not field a candidate and endorsed Flanagin.

Results

References

Ark
1862 in Arkansas
Ark
Arkansas gubernatorial elections
Non-partisan elections
Ark
Political history of the Confederate States of America